The voiceless uvular affricate is a type of consonantal sound, used in some spoken languages. The tie bar may be omitted, yielding  in the IPA and qX in X-SAMPA.

There is also the voiceless pre-uvular affricate in some languages, which is articulated slightly more front compared with the place of articulation of the prototypical voiceless uvular affricate, though not as front as the prototypical voiceless velar affricate. The equivalent X-SAMPA symbols are q_+_X_+ and k_-_x_-, respectively.

Features
Features of the voiceless uvular affricate:

Occurrence

Uvular

Pre-uvular

See also
 Index of phonetics articles

Notes

References

External links
 

Uvular consonants
Voiceless oral consonants
Central consonants
Pulmonic consonants